Johnny Reb or Johnny Rebel is a slang term for Confederate soldiers in the American Civil War.  

Johnny Reb or Johnny Rebel may also refer to:

People
Johnny Rebb, stage name of Donald James Delbridge (1939–2014), Australian country and rock'n'roll singer
Johnny Rebel (singer), stage name of Clifford Joseph Trahan (1938–2016), American country singer

Other uses
 Johnny Reb (game), a wargame designed by John Hill
 Johnny Reb and Billy Yank (book), a 1905 novel published by Alexander Hunter
 Johnny Reb and Billy Yank (comic strip), a comic strip about the Civil War
"Johnny Reb", an American Civil War-era song recorded in 1959 by Johnny Horton